The 1958 Ole Miss Rebels football team represented the University of Mississippi during the 1958 NCAA University Division football season. The Rebels were led by 12th-year head coach Johnny Vaught and played their home games at Hemingway Stadium in Oxford, Mississippi. They competed as members of the Southeastern Conference, finishing in second with a regular season record of 8–2 (3–2 SEC), and were ranked 11th in the final AP Poll. They were invited to the 1958 Gator Bowl, where they defeated fellow SEC member Florida, 7–3.

Schedule

Roster
DB Billy Brewer

References

Ole Miss
Ole Miss Rebels football seasons
Gator Bowl champion seasons
Ole Miss Rebels football